Boluran Rural District is a rural district (dehestan) in Darb-e Gonbad District, Kuhdasht County, Lorestan Province, Iran. At the 2016 census, its population was 3082, in 824 families.  The rural district has 17 villages. Boloran is the greatest and center of Rural District.

Villages of Boluran Rural District
Boluran
Bareh Kazem
Sarnaveh Changizi/Rashnoo
Sarnaveh Changizi/Golkaram
Bareh Jula
Kheyran Bareh
Cheshmeh Sefid
Ganj ali
Bareh Tork
Bareh Anar
Bareh Kheyreh
Bareh Sheykhali
Siah Cheshmeh
Kazemabad/Chenar Gareh
Bareh SeyedAhmad
Bareh Kalak
Ganj Ali Paein/Belein

References 

Rural Districts of Lorestan Province
Kuhdasht County